Amphisbaena albocingulata is a worm lizard species in the family Amphisbaenidae. It is endemic to Paraguay. It is light brown in coloration, distinguishable from other lizards in the genus by a rounded snout and visible caudal autotomy.

References

absaberi
Reptiles described in 1885
Taxa named by Oskar Boettger
Endemic fauna of Paraguay
Reptiles of Paraguay